Willie Obiano  (born August 8, 1955) is a Nigerian politician, banker and technocrat. He served as the fourth democratically elected Governor of Anambra State from 17 March 2014 to 17 March 2022.

Early life
Governor Obiano was born at Aguleri, a town in Anambra State, Eastern Nigeria.
He received a bachelor's degree in Accountancy from the University of Lagos in 1979 and a Master of Business Administration from the same university.

Banking career
Governor Obiano began his banking career in 1981 at the First Bank of Nigeria before he left to join the services of Chevron Oil Nigeria Plc as an accountant and rose to the position of  Chief Internal Auditor.
In 1989, he was one of the auditors that audited Texaco Refinery in Rotterdam, Netherlands.
In 1991, he joined the  Fidelity Bank as Deputy Manager and head of Audit unit and rose to the position of executive director in October 2003.

Political life
Obiano left the banking system to join Nigerian politics and in 2013 contested the November 16, 17 and 30 Anambra State gubernatorial elections on the platform of the All Progressives Grand Alliance, APGA. He won the election and was sworn in on 17 March 2014 to succeed Mr Peter Obi. On 18 November 2017, he was re-elected as Governor.
His tenure ended on the 17 March 2022.

Corruption allegations
In late November 2021, not long after Charles Chukwuma Soludo was elected as Obiano's successor, it emerged that the Economic and Financial Crimes Commission had placed Obiano on a watchlist so it would be informed if he left the nation; Obiano had flown abroad earlier in November. In response to the EFCC's move, the Anambra Commissioner for Information and Public Enlightenment, Don Adinuba, stated that the EFCC had gone to a "new low" by releasing the letter placing Obiano on the list. Adinuba also claimed that it was well known that Obiano was planning on moving to his residence in the United States after leaving office.

Although the EFCC did not state the reason for the watchlist placement, speculation about potential investigations in alleged corruption led journalists to investigate the finances of the Obiano administration. On 30 November 2021, the Peoples Gazette released an exclusive on bank documents showing that on 29 March 2017, Obiano had withdrawn over ₦4 billion from multiple Anambra security vote allocation accounts with no stated explanation. Adinuba rebutted that "the document...doesn’t appear genuine" and "the figures you quote look extremely ridiculous."

Hours after Obiano left office and thus lost immunity from prosecution on 17 March 2022, he was arrested by the EFCC at the Murtala Muhammed International Airport in Lagos. The reason for the arrest is yet to be announced but EFCC spokesperson Wilson Uwajaren said it was connected to the watchlist placement and that Obiano was attempting to flee the nation. The EFCC stated that the reason for the arrest and detention of the immediate past Governor of Anambra State was to enable him account for public funds amounting to N42 billion meant for security votes and Federal Government-funded Subsidy Reinvestment Programme aka SURE-P.

See also
List of Governors of Anambra State

References

1955 births
Living people
Igbo people
Nigerian Roman Catholics
All Progressives Grand Alliance politicians
Anambra State politicians
Governors of Anambra State
Nigerian bankers
University of Lagos alumni